Luis Ribera (15 April 1929 – 26 January 1979) was an Argentine modern pentathlete. He competed at the 1952, 1956 and 1960 Summer Olympics.

References

External links
 

1929 births
1979 deaths
Argentine male modern pentathletes
Olympic modern pentathletes of Argentina
Modern pentathletes at the 1952 Summer Olympics
Modern pentathletes at the 1956 Summer Olympics
Modern pentathletes at the 1960 Summer Olympics
People from Chivilcoy
Sportspeople from Buenos Aires Province
20th-century Argentine people